Courage of the North is a 1935 American Western film directed by Robert Emmett Tansey and starring John Preston, William Desmond and Tom London.

Cast
 John Preston as Sergeant Bruce Morton
 William Desmond as Gene Travis
 June Love as Yvonne Travis
 Jimmy Aubrey as Constable Jimmy Downs 
 Tom London as Mordant
 James Sheridan as The Hawk, Mordant Henchman 
 Chief White Feather as White Feather, a Trapper 
 Dynamite the Horse as Dynamite, Morton's Horse
 Captain, King of Dogs as Captain, Morton's Dog

References

Bibliography
 Michael R. Pitts. Poverty Row Studios, 1929–1940: An Illustrated History of 55 Independent Film Companies, with a Filmography for Each. McFarland & Company, 2005.

External links
 

1935 films
1935 Western (genre) films
American Western (genre) films
American black-and-white films
1930s English-language films
Films directed by Robert Emmett Tansey
Royal Canadian Mounted Police in fiction
1930s American films